Ferrin is an unincorporated community in Clinton County, Illinois, United States.

History
In 1913, Ferrin was an unincorporated community located East of Carlyle.  It had four businesses and about 70 inhabitants.

References

Unincorporated communities in Clinton County, Illinois
Unincorporated communities in Illinois